A region-by-region list of fairy and folk tales collected and retold by Ruth Manning-Sanders (1886–1988). Regions (or cultural groups) are as listed by Manning-Sanders in either the table of contents, the forewords or the introductions of her various fairy tale anthologies. This list contains most of the fairy-tale titles that have links from Manning-Sanders' biography page. Exceptions are Stories from the English and Scottish Ballads and A Book of Magical Beasts, an anthology of others' works that she edited.

Africa
The Kindly Ghost, A Book of Ghosts and Goblins
Mainu the Frog, A Book of Magic Animals
Niassa and the Ogre, A Book of Princes and Princesses
The Pick Handle, A Book of Enchantments and Curses
The Seven Monsters, A Book of Monsters
The spirits in the rat-hole, The Haunted Castle
Terry Gong-Gong, Fox Tales
The Two Wizards, A Book of Wizards and A Choice of Magic
Walker by Moonlight, The Three Witch Maidens
What Came of Quarreling, A Book of Magic Horses
What did you do? Fox Tales

Alaska
The Caribou Wife, Folk and Fairy Tales

Alsace
The Kittle-Kittle Car, A Book of Devils and Demons

American Indian
Adventures of Coyote, Red Indian Folk and Fairy Tales
Adventures of Rabbit, Red Indian Folk and Fairy Tales
Beautiful Girl, Red Indian Folk and Fairy Tales
Beaver and Porcupine, Red Indian Folk and Fairy Tales
The Fat Grandmother, Red Indian Folk and Fairy Tales
The Forbidden Valley, The Haunted Castle
Good Man and Bad Man, Red Indian Folk and Fairy Tales
Grasshopper and Fox, Tortoise Tales
Hare Running, Tortoise Tales
The Magic Pebble, Red Indian Folk and Fairy Tales
Micabo's Island, Red Indian Folk and Fairy Tales
Napi and Nip, Red Indian Folk and Fairy Tales
The Ogre, the Sun, and the Raven, A Book of Charms and Changelings
Otter Heart and the Magic Kettle, Red Indian Folk and Fairy Tales
Proud Girl and Bold Eagle, Red Indian Folk and Fairy Tales
Rabbit and the Wolves, Tortoise Tales
Raven and the Wicked One, Red Indian Folk and Fairy Tales
Raven Boy and Little Hawk, Red Indian Folk and Fairy Tales
Smoke Bones, Folk and Fairy Tales
Snake Ogre, Red Indian Folk and Fairy Tales
Star Maiden, Red Indian Folk and Fairy Tales
Sun Arrow, Red Indian Folk and Fairy Tales
Tortoise and the Children, Tortoise Tales
Tortoise and Ogre, Tortoise Tales
Ugly Thing, Red Indian Folk and Fairy Tales
Young Mouse, Red Indian Folk and Fairy Tales
Zini and the Witches, Red Indian Folk and Fairy Tales

Arabia
Aladdin, A Book of Wizards and A Choice of Magic
The Four Abdallahs, A Book of Mermaids
Hassan the Ropemaker, Sir Green Hat and the Wizard
Little Mukra, A Book of Dwarfs

Archangel
The Leeshy Cat, A Book of Cats and Creatures
The Princess's Slippers, A Book of Princes and Princesses and A Choice of Magic

Australia
The Bunyip, Old Witch Boneyleg
Crow and the Pelicans, The Haunted Castle
Goralasi and the Spectres, A Book of Spooks and Spectres

Austria
Oda and the Snake, A Book of Sorcerers and Spells
The Tailor and the Hunter, Sir Green Hat and the Wizard

Bavaria
Plain Peter, Sir Green Hat and the Wizard

Bohemia
Dunber, A Book of Monsters
The Giants in the Valley, The Three Witch Maidens
Johnny and the Witch-Maidens, A Book of Witches and A Choice of Magic
Long, Broad and Sharpsight, A Book of Wizards and Folk and Fairy Tales
The Princess in the Iron Tower, A Book of Magic Horses
Rubizal and the Miller's Daughter, A Book of Spooks and Spectres
Rubizal's Black Horse, A Book of Magic Horses
The Spook and the Pigs, A Book of Spooks and Spectres

Bosnia
The Magic Bridle, A Book of Charms and Changelings
What Happened to Ivan, A Book of Kings and Queens

Brittany
The Groach of the Isle of Lok, A Book of Mermaids
Little Barbette, A Book of Magic Animals
The Magic Belt, A Book of Princes and Princesses
Margrette, A Book of Mermaids
The North-west Wind, A Book of Magic Animals
Pippi Menou and the Hanging Palace, Sir Green Hat and the Wizard
The White Cat and the Green Snake, A Book of Princes and Princesses
The White Lamb, A Book of Charms and Changelings

Bukovina
The Hazel-Nut Child, A Book of Dwarfs

Carpathian Mountains
The Little Red Mannikin, A Book of Devils and Demons

Caucasus
The little cake, Fox Tales

China
Baskets in a Little Cart, A Book of Dragons
Chien Tang, A Book of Dragons
Chien-Nang, A Book of Charms and Changelings
Football on a Lake, A Book of Spooks and Spectres
The Yellow Dragon, A Book of Dragons

Cornwall
Barker's Knee, Peter and the Piskies: Cornish Folk and Fairy Tales
Betty Stogs' Baby, Peter and the Piskies: Cornish Folk and Fairy Tales
The Boy and the Bull, Peter and the Piskies: Cornish Folk and Fairy Tales
Bucca Dhu and Bucca Gwidden, Peter and the Piskies: Cornish Folk and Fairy Tales
Cherry, Peter and the Piskies: Cornish Folk and Fairy Tales
The Cock-Crow Stone, Peter and the Piskies: Cornish Folk and Fairy Tales
The Crowza Stones, Peter and the Piskies: Cornish Folk and Fairy Tales
The Demon Mason, Peter and the Piskies: Cornish Folk and Fairy Tales
Duffy and the Devil, Peter and the Piskies: Cornish Folk and Fairy Tales
Fairies on the Gump, Peter and the Piskies: Cornish Folk and Fairy Tales
From the Head Downward, Peter and the Piskies: Cornish Folk and Fairy Tales
The Giant Holiburn, Peter and the Piskies: Cornish Folk and Fairy Tales
The Giant of the Mount, Peter and the Piskies: Cornish Folk and Fairy Tales
How Jack Made His Fortune, A Book of Magic Horses
Jack the Giant-Killer, A Book of Giants
The Knockers of Ballowal, Peter and the Piskies: Cornish Folk and Fairy Tales
Lutey and the Mermaid, Peter and the Piskies: Cornish Folk and Fairy Tales
Lyonesse, Peter and the Piskies: Cornish Folk and Fairy Tales
Madgy Figgey and the Sow, Peter and the Piskies: Cornish Folk and Fairy Tales
Master Billy, A Book of Magic Horses
The Mermaid in Church, Peter and the Piskies: Cornish Folk and Fairy Tales
Mr Noy, Peter and the Piskies: Cornish Folk and Fairy Tales
Parson Wood and the Devil, Peter and the Piskies: Cornish Folk and Fairy Tales
Peepan Pee, Peter and the Piskies: Cornish Folk and Fairy Tales
Peter and the Piskies, Peter and the Piskies: Cornish Folk and Fairy Tales
The Piskie Thresher, Peter and the Piskies: Cornish Folk and Fairy Tales
Saint Margery Daw, Peter and the Piskies: Cornish Folk and Fairy Tales
Saint Neot, Peter and the Piskies: Cornish Folk and Fairy Tales
Skillywidden, Peter and the Piskies: Cornish Folk and Fairy Tales
The Small People's Cow, Peter and the Piskies: Cornish Folk and Fairy Tales
Sneezy Snatcher and Sammy Small, A Book of Giants
The Spriggans' Treasure, Peter and the Piskies: Cornish Folk and Fairy Tales
The Tinner, the Dog, the Jew, and the Cake, Peter and the Piskies: Cornish Folk and Fairy Tales
Tom and Giant Blunderbus, Peter and the Piskies: Cornish Folk and Fairy Tales
Tredrill, A Book of Charms and Changelings
Tregeagle, Peter and the Piskies: Cornish Folk and Fairy Tales
The Two Sillies, Peter and the Piskies: Cornish Folk and Fairy Tales
The Wish-hound, Peter and the Piskies: Cornish Folk and Fairy Tales
The Witch of Fraddam, Peter and the Piskies: Cornish Folk and Fairy Tales

Corsica
Golden Hair, A Book of Ghosts and Goblins and A Choice of Magic

Creole
Hyena and Hare, Tortoise Tales

Czechoslovakia
King Josef, A Book of Kings and Queens and Folk and Fairy Tales
Little pot, cook!, The Haunted Castle
The Tailor, the Devil, and the Frogs, The Three Witch Maidens
The Water Nick, A Book of Cats and Creatures

Denmark
Esben and the Witch, A Book of Witches and A Choice of Magic
Franz the Garden Boy, A Book of Magic Horses
Heaven Forbid!, A Book of Spooks and Spectres
Little Wonder, A Book of Cats and Creatures
Mons Tro, A Choice of Magic
Nils in the Forest, A Book of Ogres and Trolls
Rake Up!, A Book of Mermaids and A Choice of Magic
A Ride to Hell, A Book of Devils and Demons
Sir Green Hat and the Wizard, Sir Green Hat and the Wizard
The Spook and the Beer Barrel, A Book of Spooks and Spectres
The Story of Maia, A Book of Dwarfs
Sven and Lilli, A Book of Mermaids and A Choice of Magic
Tossen the Fool, Old Witch Boneyleg
Tripple-Trapple, A Book of Devils and Demons
The Troll's Little Daughter, A Book of Ogres and Trolls
The White Dove, A Book of Witches

East Africa
Fox and Weasel, Fox Tales
Tortoise and Elephant, Tortoise Tales

Egypt
Fox and Crow, Fox Tales

England
The Cauld Lad of Hilton, Old Witch Boneyleg
The Golden Ball, A Book of Ghosts and Goblins
Jack and the Beanstalk, A Book of Giants and A Choice of Magic
Little Jip, A Book of Ghosts and Goblins
Old Tommy and the Spectre, A Book of Spooks and Spectres
The Old Witch, A Book of Witches and Folk and Fairy Tales
The Small-tooth Dog, A Book of Magic Animals
Sneezy Snatcher and Sammy Small, A Choice of Magic

Estonia
The Cook and the House Goblin, A Book of Ghosts and Goblins
Fox the gooseherd, Fox Tales
The Goblins at the Bath House, A Book of Ghosts and Goblins and A Choice of Magic
The Hat, A Book of Charms and Changelings
The Haunted Castle, The Haunted Castle
The Lake, A Book of Spooks and Spectres
Water Drops, A Book of Ghosts and Goblins

Ethiopia
Hare's Ears, Tortoise Tales

Finland
The fish cart, Fox Tales
The Flute Player, A Book of Charms and Changelings
Rabbit and Our Old Woman, Tortoise Tales
Something Wonderful, A Book of Devils and Demons and Folk and Fairy Tales
The well, Fox Tales

Flanders
Rich Woman, Poor Woman, A Book of Wizards

France
The Antmolly Birds, Jonnikin and the Flying Basket: French Folk and Fairy Tales
The Beauty and Her Gallant, A Book of Ghosts and Goblins
The Broken Pitcher, Old Witch Boneyleg
The Dapple Horse, A Book of Magic Horses
The Gold Dragoon, Jonnikin and the Flying Basket: French Folk and Fairy Tales
The Handsome Apprentice, Jonnikin and the Flying Basket: French Folk and Fairy Tales
Jonnikin and the Flying Basket, Jonnikin and the Flying Basket: French Folk and Fairy Tales
The King of the Crows, Jonnikin and the Flying Basket: French Folk and Fairy Tales
The Leg of Gold, A Book of Ghosts and Goblins
The Little Milleress, Jonnikin and the Flying Basket: French Folk and Fairy Tales
The Magic Wand, Jonnikin and the Flying Basket: French Folk and Fairy Tales
The Night of Four Times, Jonnikin and the Flying Basket: French Folk and Fairy Tales
The Nine White Sheep, Jonnikin and the Flying Basket: French Folk and Fairy Tales
Pappa Greatnose, A Book of Ghosts and Goblins
The Prince of the Seven Golden Cows, Jonnikin and the Flying Basket: French Folk and Fairy Tales
Princess Felicity, A Book of Princes and Princesses
The Small Men and the Weaver, Jonnikin and the Flying Basket: French Folk and Fairy Tales
The Snake Monster, Jonnikin and the Flying Basket: French Folk and Fairy Tales
The Son of the King of Spain, Jonnikin and the Flying Basket: French Folk and Fairy Tales
The Sword of the Stone, Jonnikin and the Flying Basket: French Folk and Fairy Tales
Tam and Tessa, Jonnikin and the Flying Basket: French Folk and Fairy Tales
The Thirteen Flies, Jonnikin and the Flying Basket: French Folk and Fairy Tales
The Young Shepherd, Jonnikin and the Flying Basket: French Folk and Fairy Tales

French Canada
Jon and his Brothers, A Book of Magic Animals and Folk and Fairy Tales

Gascony
The Blacksmith and the Devil, A Book of Devils and Demons

Georgia
The Giant and the Dwarf, A Book of Giants

Germany
The Brave Little Tailor, A Book of Giants
The Cobbler and the Dwarfs, A Book of Dwarfs
The Comb, the Flute and the Spinning Wheel, A Book of Mermaids
The Curse of the Very Small Man, A Book of Enchantments and Curses
The Dancing Pigs, Old Witch Boneyleg
The Donkey Lettuce, A Book of Witches
The Dragon and His Grandmother, A Book of Dragons
Elsa and the Bear, A Book of Magic Animals
Fir Cones, A Book of Dwarfs
The Girl Who Picked Strawberries, A Book of Dwarfs and A Choice of Magic
The Gold Stag, Old Witch Boneyleg
The Golden Kingdom, The Haunted Castle
Ha! ha! ha!, A Book of Spooks and Spectres
Hansel and Gretel, A Book of Witches
The Imp Cat, A Book of Cats and Creatures
The Inn of the Stone and Spectre, A Book of Spooks and Spectres
Katchen the Cat, A Book of Cats and Creatures
Lazy Hans, A Book of Witches
The Little Tailor and the Three Dogs, A Book of Ogres and Trolls and Folk and Fairy Tales
Mannikin Spanalong, A Book of Sorcerers and Spells
Peter, A Book of Enchantments and Curses
The queen in the garden, The Haunted Castle
Rapunzel, A Book of Witches
Snow White and the Seven Dwarfs, A Book of Dwarfs
Tangletop, A Book of Spooks and Spectres
The Three Dogs, A Book of Dragons
The Three Golden Hairs of the King of the Cave Giants, A Book of Giants
The Three Little Men in the Wood, A Book of Dwarfs
Thumbkin, A Book of Dwarfs
The very little man, Fox Tales

Greece
Alas!, Damian and the Dragon: Modern Greek Folk-Tales
The Bay-Tree Maiden, Damian and the Dragon: Modern Greek Folk-Tales
The Beardless One, Damian and the Dragon: Modern Greek Folk-Tales
Big Matsiko, Damian and the Dragon: Modern Greek Folk-Tales
The Cats, Damian and the Dragon: Modern Greek Folk-Tales
Constantes and the Dragon, A Book of Dragons and A Choice of Magic
The Cunning Old Man and the Three Rogues, Damian and the Dragon: Modern Greek Folk-Tales
Damian and the Dragon, Damian and the Dragon: Modern Greek Folk-Tales
The Dragon of the Well, A Book of Dragons
The Four Fishes, Damian and the Dragon: Modern Greek Folk-Tales
The Golden Casket, Damian and the Dragon: Modern Greek Folk-Tales
The King's Beard, Old Witch Boneyleg
The Lion, the Tiger and the Eagle, Damian and the Dragon: Modern Greek Folk-Tales
Luck, Damian and the Dragon: Modern Greek Folk-Tales
The Melodious Napkin, Damian and the Dragon: Modern Greek Folk-Tales
My Candlestick, Damian and the Dragon: Modern Greek Folk-Tales
My Lady Sea, Damian and the Dragon: Modern Greek Folk-Tales
The Nine Doves, A Book of Dragons and A Choice of Magic
Penteclemas and the Pea, Damian and the Dragon: Modern Greek Folk-Tales
Pepito, A Book of Dragons
The Prince and the Vizier's Son, Damian and the Dragon: Modern Greek Folk-Tales
The Sleeping Prince, Damian and the Dragon: Modern Greek Folk-Tales
The Sneezing Ring, The Three Witch Maidens
The Three Precepts, Damian and the Dragon: Modern Greek Folk-Tales
The Twins, Damian and the Dragon: Modern Greek Folk-Tales
The Wild Man, Damian and the Dragon: Modern Greek Folk-Tales
Yiankos, Damian and the Dragon: Modern Greek Folk-Tales

Greek Isles
Selim and the Snake Queen, A Book of Kings and Queens and Folk and Fairy Tales

Gypsy
Bald Pate, The Red King and the Witch: Gypsy Folk and Fairy Tales
The Black Dog of the Wild Forest, The Red King and the Witch: Gypsy Folk and Fairy Tales
Brian and the Fox, The Red King and the Witch: Gypsy Folk and Fairy Tales
The Brigands and the Miller's Daughter, The Red King and the Witch: Gypsy Folk and Fairy Tales
The Deluded Dragon, The Red King and the Witch: Gypsy Folk and Fairy Tales
The Dog and the Maiden, The Red King and the Witch: Gypsy Folk and Fairy Tales
The Dragon and the Stepmother, The Red King and the Witch: Gypsy Folk and Fairy Tales
Fedor and the Fairy, A Book of Charms and Changelings
The Foam Maiden, A Book of Sorcerers and Spells
Happy Boz'll, The Red King and the Witch: Gypsy Folk and Fairy Tales
The Hen That Laid Diamond Eggs, The Red King and the Witch: Gypsy Folk and Fairy Tales
It All Comes To Light, The Red King and the Witch: Gypsy Folk and Fairy Tales
Jack and His Golden Snuff-Box, The Red King and the Witch: Gypsy Folk and Fairy Tales
Jankyn and the Witch, The Red King and the Witch: Gypsy Folk and Fairy Tales
The Little Bull-Calf, The Red King and the Witch: Gypsy Folk and Fairy Tales
The Little Fox, The Red King and the Witch: Gypsy Folk and Fairy Tales
The Little Nobleman, The Red King and the Witch: Gypsy Folk and Fairy Tales
An Old King and His Three Sons of England, The Red King and the Witch: Gypsy Folk and Fairy Tales
The Old Soldier and the Mischief, The Red King and the Witch: Gypsy Folk and Fairy Tales
The Red King and the Witch, The Red King and the Witch: Gypsy Folk and Fairy Tales
The Riddle, The Red King and the Witch: Gypsy Folk and Fairy Tales
The Snake, The Red King and the Witch: Gypsy Folk and Fairy Tales
Sylvester, The Red King and the Witch: Gypsy Folk and Fairy Tales
The Tale of a Foolish Brother and of a Wonderful Bush, The Red King and the Witch: Gypsy Folk and Fairy Tales
The Three Princesses and the Unclean Spirit, The Red King and the Witch: Gypsy Folk and Fairy Tales
The Tinker and His Wife, The Red King and the Witch: Gypsy Folk and Fairy Tales
Tropsyn, The Red King and the Witch: Gypsy Folk and Fairy Tales

Hanover
The Porridge Pot, Sir Green Hat and the Wizard

Hartz Mountains
The Eighteen Soldiers, The Three Witch Maidens

Holland
The Sailor and the Devil, Folk and Fairy Tales

Hungary
The Adventures of Pengo, The Glass Man and the Golden Bird: Hungarian Folk and Fairy Tales
The Cock and the Hen, The Glass Man and the Golden Bird: Hungarian Folk and Fairy Tales
Dummling, The Glass Man and the Golden Bird: Hungarian Folk and Fairy Tales
The Enchanted Prince, A Book of Princes and Princesses and A Choice of Magic
The Fairy Helena, The Glass Man and the Golden Bird: Hungarian Folk and Fairy Tales
The Fiddle, The Glass Man and the Golden Bird: Hungarian Folk and Fairy Tales
Giant Babolna, Old Witch Boneyleg
Gisella and the Goat, The Glass Man and the Golden Bird: Hungarian Folk and Fairy Tales
The Glass Man and the Golden Bird, The Glass Man and the Golden Bird: Hungarian Folk and Fairy Tales
A Handful of Hay, The Glass Man and the Golden Bird: Hungarian Folk and Fairy Tales
Hans and His Master, A Book of Ghosts and Goblins and A Choice of Magic
In the wolf pit, Fox Tales
Ironhead, A Book of Devils and Demons
Jack at Hell Gate, A Book of Devils and Demons
Kate Contrary, The Glass Man and the Golden Bird: Hungarian Folk and Fairy Tales
Little Firenko, The Glass Man and the Golden Bird: Hungarian Folk and Fairy Tales
The Lost Children, The Glass Man and the Golden Bird: Hungarian Folk and Fairy Tales
Melitsa the Beautiful, The Haunted Castle
The Nine Peahens and the Golden Apples, The Glass Man and the Golden Bird: Hungarian Folk and Fairy Tales
The Nine Ravens, The Three Witch Maidens
The Peppercorn Oxen, A Book of Devils and Demons
Prince Mirko, The Glass Man and the Golden Bird: Hungarian Folk and Fairy Tales
The Ram with the Golden Fleece, The Glass Man and the Golden Bird: Hungarian Folk and Fairy Tales
The Secret-Keeping Boy, The Glass Man and the Golden Bird: Hungarian Folk and Fairy Tales
The Seven Simons, The Glass Man and the Golden Bird: Hungarian Folk and Fairy Tales
The Silver Penny, A Book of Wizards and Folk and Fairy Tales
The Spotted Cow, The Glass Man and the Golden Bird: Hungarian Folk and Fairy Tales
The Three Lemons, The Glass Man and the Golden Bird: Hungarian Folk and Fairy Tales
Uletka, The Glass Man and the Golden Bird: Hungarian Folk and Fairy Tales
The Witch and the Swan Maiden, The Glass Man and the Golden Bird: Hungarian Folk and Fairy Tales
The Wonderful Tree, The Glass Man and the Golden Bird: Hungarian Folk and Fairy Tales

Iceland
Cow Bu-cola, A Book of Ogres and Trolls
Dilly-dilly-doh!, A Book of Spooks and Spectres
The Farmer and the Water Fairies, Old Witch Boneyleg
The Gold Knob, A Book of Ogres and Trolls
The Headless Horseman, A Book of Ghosts and Goblins
Jon and the Troll Wife, A Book of Ogres and Trolls
The Lost Prince, A Book of Mermaids and Folk and Fairy Tales
Sigurd the King's Son, A Book of Ogres and Trolls

India
Fox and Crocodile, Fox Tales
A Game of Cards with the King of Demons, The Three Witch Maidens
The good old man, the thief, and the ghost, The Haunted Castle
The Kingdom of Ocean, A Book of Mermaids
Little Hiram, A Choice of Magic
Lucky or unlucky? Fox Tales
The Monkey Nursemaid, A Book of Devils and Demons

Ireland
The Adventures of Billy MacDaniel, A Choice of Magic
The Blackstairs Mountain, A Book of Witches
Bottle Hill, A Book of Dwarfs and A Choice of Magic
Conall Yellowclaw, A Book of Giants
The Field of Ragwort, A Book of Dwarfs
Fin M'Coul and Cucullin, A Book of Giants and Folk and Fairy Tales
The Good Woman, A Book of Ghosts and Goblins
The Great Bear of Orange, A Book of Sorcerers and Spells
The Magic Lake, A Book of Mermaids and A Choice of Magic
The Magical Tune, A Book of Mermaids
The Palace of the Seven Little Hills, A Book of Sorcerers and Spells
The Sleeper, A Book of Sorcerers and Spells
The Strange Adventure of Paddy O'Toole, A Book of Ghosts and Goblins
The Teapot Spout, A Book of Kings and Queens
The Thirteenth Son of the King of Erin, A Book of Dragons
Tritil, Litil, and the Birds, A Book of Ogres and Trolls

Italy
The Black Spectre, A Book of Spooks and Spectres (in South Tyrol)
Cannetella, A Book of Wizards
The Girl in the Basket, A Book of Ogres and Trolls and Folk and Fairy Tales
The Magic Monkeys, A Book of Sorcerers and Spells
Prunella, A Book of Witches
The She-Bear, A Book of Princes and Princesses
The Three Mermaids, A Book of Mermaids and A Choice of Magic
The Three Silver Balls, A Book of Ghosts and Goblins

Jamaica
Beedul-a-bup!, A Book of Magic Horses
Gar-room!, Tortoise Tales
Sarah Winyan, A Book of Enchantments and Curses

Japan
The Little Jizo, Sir Green Hat and the Wizard
My Lord Bag of Rice, A Book of Dragons and Folk and Fairy Tales
Timimoto, A Book of Dwarfs

Jutland
Hans, the Horn, and the Magic Sword, A Book of Giants
The Skipper and the Dwarfs, A Book of Dwarfs and Folk and Fairy Tales

Kashmir
Stupid Head, A Book of Princes and Princesses

Korea
The Enchanted Wine Jug, A Book of Charms and Changelings
Strange Visitors, A Book of Spooks and Spectres
Yi Chang and the Spectres, A Book of Spooks and Spectres

Latvia
Monster Grabber and the King's Daughter, A Book of Magic Horses

Macedonia
The Monster in the Mill, A Book of Monsters and Folk and Fairy Tales
Pentalina, A Book of Monsters
Yanni, A Book of Dragons

Madagascar
The Monster with Seven Heads, A Book of Kings and Queens and Folk and Fairy Tales
Oh Mr Crocodile, A Book of Cats and Creatures

Majorca
A Box on the Ear, A Book of Ghosts and Goblins
The Dolphin, A Book of Magic Animals

Mediterranean Sea
A-tishoo!, Gianni and the Ogre
Bardiello, Gianni and the Ogre
The Bean Tree, Gianni and the Ogre
Celery, Gianni and the Ogre
The Daughter of the Dwarf, Gianni and the Ogre
The Doll, Gianni and the Ogre
The Fiddler Going Home, Gianni and the Ogre
Gianni and the Ogre, Gianni and the Ogre
Grillo, Gianni and the Ogre
Kabadaluk, Gianni and the Ogre
King Fox, Gianni and the Ogre
Little Finger, Gianni and the Ogre
Mother Sunday, Gianni and the Ogre
Oudelette, Gianni and the Ogre
Peppino, Gianni and the Ogre
The Spider, Gianni and the Ogre
The Three Ravens, Gianni and the Ogre
Trim Tram Turvey, Gianni and the Ogre

Mongolia
The Blue-grey Fleece, Sir Green Hat and the Wizard

Netherlands
Malegy's Palfrey, A Book of Magic Horses

New Zealand
Tawhaki, The Three Witch Maidens

Norse and/or Norway
Farmer Weathersky, A Book of Wizards
Freddy and his Fiddle, A Book of Dwarfs
The Giant Who Had No Heart in His Body, A Book of Giants and Folk and Fairy Tales
The Hill Demon, A Book of Devils and Demons
Tatterhood, A Book of Witches and A Choice of Magic

North Africa
The Mossy Rock, A Book of Sorcerers and Spells

Nova Scotia
Fox and Hare, Fox Tales

Poland
The Adventures of Gregor, A Book of Magic Horses
The Cat Johann, A Book of Cats and Creatures

Pomerania
The Cow, The Three Witch Maidens
Dear Grey, The Haunted Castle
Father Wren and King Tiger, A Book of Cats and Creatures
The Glassy Bridge, Sir Green Hat and the Wizard
The gold spinner, The Haunted Castle
A Lying Story, A Book of Enchantments and Curses
The Two Enemy Kings, A Book of Kings and Queens
The Queen's Ring, A Book of Enchantments and Curses

Portugal
The Geese and the Golden Chain, A Book of Mermaids

Romania
Prince Loaf, A Book of Giants and A Choice of Magic
Stan Bolovan, A Book of Dragons and A Choice of Magic

Rügen
The Silver Bell, A Book of Dwarfs

Russia
Bull's Winter House, A Book of Magic Animals
Catrinella, Come up Higher!, A Book of Enchantments and Curses
The Children on the Pillar, A Book of Ogres and Trolls
The Crane's Purse, Sir Green Hat and the Wizard
Eh! Eh! Tralala!, A Book of Magic Animals
Go I Know Not Whither and Fetch I Know Not What, A Book of Sorcerers and Spells
The Goat in the Sky, A Book of Cats and Creatures
The Good Ogre, A Book of Ogres and Trolls
The Great Golloping Wolf, A Book of Monsters
King Eagle, A Book of Kings and Queens
Kojata, A Book of Wizards
Little Cat and Little Hen, Tortoise Tales
The Little Humpbacked Horse, A Book of Magic Animals
Little Sister Fox, Tortoise Tales
Monster Copper Forehead, A Book of Monsters
Nanny Goat with Nuts, Tortoise Tales
Natasha Most Lovely, Old Witch Boneyleg
Old Man Zackery and the Cranes, A Book of Cats and Creatures
Old Verlooka, A Choice of Magic
Old Witch Boneyleg, Old Witch Boneyleg
Pancakes and Pies, A Book of Charms and Changelings
A Pool of Bright Water, A Book of Cats and Creatures
The Queen's Children, A Book of Kings and Queens
The Silver Dish, The Three Witch Maidens
The Spooks' Party, A Book of Spooks and Spectres
The Straw Horse, A Book of Magic Horses
The Three Ivans, A Book of Sorcerers and Spells
Two Minutes, Old Witch Boneyleg
The Twins and the Snarling Witch, A Book of Witches
Umbrella, Fox Tales
Vanka, Sir Green Hat and the Wizard
Vasilissa Most Lovely, A Book of Enchantments and Curses and Folk and Fairy Tales
Vanooshka, A Book of Kings and Queens
Whoa-ho!, A Book of Magic Horses
Wits But No Money, A Book of Magic Horses
The Wizard King, A Book of Princes and Princesses
A Wonderful Bird, A Book of Cats and Creatures
The Wonderful Shirt, A Choice of Magic

Savoy
The Dance of the Spectres, A Book of Spooks and Spectres

Schleswig-Holstein
The New Horse, A Book of Magic Horses
Tummeldink, A Book of Spooks and Spectres

Scotland
The Black Bull of Norroway, Scottish Folk Tales
Conall Yellowclaw, A Book of Giants
Flitting, Scottish Folk Tales
The Giant in the Cave, A Book of Giants
Green caps, Scottish Folk Tales
In a sack, Scottish Folk Tales
The Laird of Co, Scottish Folk Tales
The little wee man, Scottish Folk Tales
The Loch Ness Kelpie, Scottish Folk Tales
Mester Stoorworm, Scottish Folk Tales
Merman Rosmer, A Book of Mermaids and Folk and Fairy Tales
My own self, Scottish Folk Tales
The seal-hunter and the mermen, Scottish Folk Tales
The seal-wife, Scottish Folk Tales
Seven Inches, Scottish Folk Tales
The shadow, Scottish Folk Tales
Short Hoggers, Scottish Folk Tales
The Strange Visitor, Scottish Folk Tales
The Tailor in the Church, A Book of Ghosts and Goblins
The Untidy Mermaid, A Book of Mermaids
The wee bit mousikie, Scottish Folk Tales
The Well at the World's End, Scottish Folk Tales
Whirra whirra bump!, Scottish Folk Tales

Serbia
The Prince and the Dragons, A Book of Princes and Princesses

Siberia
The Bird Wife, A Book of Cats and Creatures
The Maiden Suvarna, A Book of Ghosts and Goblins

Sicily
The All-seeing Sun, Sir Green Hat and the Wizard
Aniello, A Book of Wizards and A Choice of Magic
The Beauty of the Golden Star, A Book of Magic Horses
Dough, A Book of Kings and Queens
The Goat in Bed, The Three Witch Maidens
The Golden Valley, A Book of Monsters
The Green Bird, A Book of Ogres and Trolls
The Ogre's Breath, A Book of Ogres and Trolls
Peppi, A Book of Charms and Changelings
Rags and Tatters, A Book of Princes and Princesses
Unfortunate, A Book of Enchantments and Curses

Silesia
Rubizal, A Book of Charms and Changelings

Slavic
The Dwarf with the Long Beard, A Book of Charms and Changelings
Gold Lambs and Silver Lambs, Sir Green Hat and the Wizard
King Johnny, A Book of Giants and A Choice of Magic
The Prince with the Golden Hand, A Book of Dragons

Slavonia
The old woman and the oak tree, The Haunted Castle

South Africa
Voo-too-koo, Sir Green Hat and the Wizard (also listed as a Zulu tale)

South America
The King of the Vultures, The Three Witch Maidens
The Magic Roots, Folk and Fairy Tales

Spain
Black, Red, and Gold, A Book of Enchantments and Curses
Bring me a Light, A Book of Ghosts and Goblins
The Knights of the Fish, A Book of Enchantments and Curses and Folk and Fairy Tales
The Ring, A Book of Ghosts and Goblins

Sudan
Foni and Fotia, A Book of Sorcerers and Spells

Sweden
The Juniper Bush, A Book of Cats and Creatures
Lassy my Boy!, The Three Witch Maidens
Lilla Rosa, A Book of Magic Animals and Folk and Fairy Tales
Prince Lindworm, A Book of Monsters

Switzerland
The Enchanted Candle, A Book of Enchantments and Curses
The Owl, A Book of Spooks and Spectres
Pussy Cat Twinkle, A Book of Cats and Creatures

Tadjakistan
The Big Bird Katchka, A Book of Cats and Creatures

Tartary
The Golden Knucklebone, A Book of Cats and Creatures
Ubir, A Book of Monsters

Transylvania
The Demon's Daughter, A Book of Devils and Demons
Iron Hans, Old Witch Boneyleg
The Princess in the Mountain, A Book of Enchantments and Curses
Sausages, Folk and Fairy Tales
Sorcerer Kaldoon, A Book of Sorcerers and Spells
The Story of the Three Young Shepherds, A Book of Monsters
The Sun Mother, A Book of Charms and Changelings
The Three Witch Maidens, The Three Witch Maidens

Turkey
Buns and honey, Fox Tales
Over the wall, Fox Tales

Tyrol
Gold, A Book of Wizards
The Singing Leaves, A Book of Monsters
The Skull, A Book of Ghosts and Goblins
Spooks a-hunting, A Book of Spooks and Spectres

Ukraine
The Frog, A Book of Princes and Princesses and A Choice of Magic

United States
La-lee-lu, A Book of Spooks and Spectres
Long John and the Mermaid, A Book of Mermaids
The Small, Small Cat, A Book of Cats and Creatures
The Spectre Wolf, A Book of Spooks and Spectres

Valley of the Nile
The Forty Goats, A Book of Charms and Changelings
The Good Oum-Aly, The Three Witch Maidens

Wales
Jack and the Wizard, A Book of Wizards and A Choice of Magic
The Lake Maiden, A Book of Mermaids

West Africa
Lu-bo-bo, A Book of Monsters

Yugoslavia
The Little Old Man in the Tree, A Book of Spooks and Spectres
The Prince and the Sky-Blue Filly, A Book of Princes and Princesses

Zeeland
Knurremurre, A Book of Dwarfs and A Choice of Magic

Zulu
Voo-too-koo, Sir Green Hat and the Wizard (also listed as a South African tale)